Kristina Andreyevna Makarenko (born 28 February 1997), née Sivkova, is a Russian athlete who specialises in sprint.

She is married to athlete Artem Makarenko. Their marriage took place in September 2019.

References

External links

1997 births
Living people
People from Omsk Oblast
Sportspeople from Omsk Oblast
Russian female sprinters
Russian Athletics Championships winners
21st-century Russian women